Loser's End is a 1935 American Western film produced by Harry S. Webb for Reliable Pictures and directed by Bernard B. Ray.

Plot summary
A cowboy meets up with a bandit gang. Taken captive, he is rescued by a man called Don Carlos, and together with a young woman named Lolita, they join forces to stop the gang's upcoming raid and bring them to justice.

Cast
 Jack Perrin – Jack
 Tina Menard – Lolita
 Frank Rice – Amos
 William Gould – Bill Meeker
 Fern Emmett – Molly O'Hara, the Cook
 Elias Lazaroff – Don Carlos Delgardo
 Robert Walker – Henchman Joe
 Jimmy Aubrey – Henchman Dick
 Rosemary Joye – Lupe Little

External links
 
 

1935 films
1935 Western (genre) films
American Western (genre) films
American black-and-white films
Films directed by Bernard B. Ray
Reliable Pictures films
1930s English-language films
1930s American films